Prohibitin, also known as PHB, is a protein that in humans is encoded by the PHB gene.
The Phb gene has also been described in animals, fungi, plants, and unicellular eukaryotes. Prohibitins are divided in two classes, termed Type-I and Type-II prohibitins, based on their similarity to yeast PHB1 and PHB2, respectively. Each organism has at least one copy of each type of prohibitin gene.

Discovery 
Prohibitins are evolutionarily conserved genes that are ubiquitously expressed.  The human prohibitin gene, located on the BRCA1 chromosome region 17q21, was originally thought to be a negative regulator of cell proliferation and a tumor suppressor.  This anti-proliferative activity was later attributed to the 3' UTR of the PHB gene, and not to the actual protein. Mutations in human PHB have been linked to sporadic breast cancer.  However, over-expression of PHB has been associated with a reduction in the androgen receptor activity and a reduction in PSA gene expression resulting in a decrease of androgen-dependent growth of cancerous prostate cells.
Prohibitin is expressed as two transcripts with varying lengths of 3' untranslated region.  The longer transcript is present at higher levels in proliferating tissues and cells, suggesting that this longer 3' untranslated region may function as a trans-acting regulatory RNA.

Function 
Prohibitins may have multiple functions including:

Mitochondrial function and morphology 
Prohibitins are assembled into a ring-like structure with 16–20 alternating Phb1 and Phb2 subunits in the inner mitochondrial membrane.  The precise molecular function of the PHB complex is not clear, but a role as chaperone for respiration chain proteins or as a general structuring scaffold required for optimal mitochondrial morphology and function are suspected. Recently, prohibitins have been demonstrated to be positive, rather than negative, regulators of cell proliferation in both plants and mice.

Transcriptional modulation 
Both human prohibitins have also been suggested to be localized in the nucleus and modulate transcriptional activity by interacting with various transcription factors, including nuclear receptors, either directly or indirectly. However, little evidence for nuclear targeting and transcription factor-binding of prohibitins has been found in other organism (yeast, plants, C. elegans, etc.), indicating that this may be a specific function in mammalian cells.

Clinical significance 

Human prohibitin 1 has some activity as a virus receptor protein, having been identified as a receptor for Chikungunya Virus  (CHIKV) and Dengue Virus 2 (DENV-2).  Little else is known about the activity of the prohibitins in viral pathogenesis.

Interactions 

Prohibitin has been shown to interact with:

 ANXA2 
 C-Raf, 
 E2F1, 
 HDAC1, 
 P53, 
 RB1, 
 RBL1, 
 RBL2, 
 SMARCA2,  and
 SMARCA4.

Drugs that bind to prohibitin
 Aurilide
 Fluorizoline
 Rocaglamide A

References

Further reading 

 
 
 
 
 
 
 
 
 
 
 
 
 
 
 
 
 
 
 

Genes on human chromosome 17